Joe Cracknell may refer to:

Joe Cracknell (cricketer) (born 2000), English cricketer
Joe Cracknell (footballer) (born 1994), English footballer